Alpagot was one of the two s built in Italy for the Ottoman Navy in the early 20th century. The ship was launched on April 30, 1904 at the Ansaldo shipyard in Genoa, and was commissioned in June 1904. She took part in the Italo-Turkish War, during which she was sunk in Preveza on September 30, 1911.

Technical data 
The Akhisar-class torpedo boats had a hull made of steel, divided into nine watertight compartments. The boats were powered by two vertical three-cylinder triple-expansion steam engines with a total power of *, to which steam was supplied by two boilers that came from locomotive engines (also made by Ansaldo). The maximum speed of the boats, which were propelled by two screws, was 24 knots The ships carried a reserve of 60 tons of coal.

Their artillery armament consisted of two single 37 mm quick-firing Hotchkiss guns. Torpedo weapons consisted of two 450 mm deck-mounted single rotatable torpedo launchers mounted behind and in front of the bridge.

The ship's crew consisted of 4 officers and 26 non-commissioned officers and sailors.

Construction 
The torpedo boats of the Akhisar-class were ordered by the Ottoman Empire from Italy in December 1902 and a contract was signed that month for the delivery of two vessels.

Alpagot was built at the Ansaldo shipyard in Genoa (shipyard number 132). The keel of the ship was laid in 1904, and was launched on 30 April 1904.

Operational history
Having joined the Ottoman navy in June 1904, Alpagot took part in training in May 1909 as part of the reforming program of Admiral Douglas Gamble, commander of the British naval mission in Istanbul. The torpedo boats , Mosul, Kütahya, Alpagot, Hamidiye, Demirhisar and Sivrihisar sailed from Sivriada and joined the fleet, practicing torpedo attacks against larger ships. Although the exercise was not in realistic combat conditions, it was the first naval exercise of the Ottoman Navy in twenty years. At the end of the exercise, all ships passed in front of the royal yacht Ertuğrul, which was waiting off Sarayburnu.

The two ships were unable to return fire before they were sunk.

Notes

Footnotes

References
 
 
 
 

1904 ships
Torpedo boats of the Ottoman Empire
Shipwrecks in the Mediterranean Sea
Maritime incidents in 1911
Ships built in Genoa
Ships built in Italy